Hamilton East—Stoney Creek is a federal electoral district in Ontario, Canada, that has been represented in the House of Commons of Canada since 2004.

The riding was formed in 2003 from parts of the former ridings of Hamilton East and Stoney Creek.

Of the 115,709 constituents of the riding, a slight majority were previously constituents in the former riding of Stoney Creek.  58,462 constituents were part of the Stoney Creek riding while 57,247 constituents originated from Hamilton East.

This riding lost territory to Hamilton Centre during the 2012 electoral redistribution.

Demographics
According to the Canada 2021 Census

Ethnic groups: 74.9% White, 7.7% South Asian, 3.2% Indigenous, 4.3% Black, 2.1% Arab, 2.0% Latin American, 1.5% Southeast Asian, 1.5% Filipino
Languages: 67.6% English, 3.5% Italian, 2.7% Serbian, 2.3% Punjabi, 2.2% Croatian, 1.9% Polish, 1.6% Spanish, 1.5% Arabic, 1.3% Urdu, 1.2% French, 1.1% Portuguese
Religions: 57.5% Christian (33.5% Catholic, 5.1% Christian Orthodox, 3.6% Anglican, 2.8% United Church, 1.5% Presbyterian, 1.0% Pentecostal, 10.0% Other), 6.5% Muslim, 2.6% Sikh, 1.8% Hindu, 30.1% None
Median income: $38,800 (2020)
Average income: $47,360 (2020)

Geography

It consists of the part of the City of Hamilton lying north of the Niagara Escarpment and east of Ottawa Street.

The riding consists of the neighbourhoods of, Cherry Heights, Homeside, Normanhurst, McQuesten, Glenview, Rosedale, Red Hill, Vincent, Gershome, Greenford, Corman, Kentley, Riverdale, Parkview West, Parkview East, Nashdale, Lake Grayside and the eastern half of The Delta in the former City of Hamilton plus the part of the former City of Stoney Creek north of the Niagara Escarpment including the "Old Town", Fruitland and Winona.

Member of Parliament
This riding has elected the following Members of Parliament:

Election results

|align="left" colspan=2|New Democratic Party gain from Liberal
|align="right"|Swing
|align="right"| -1.4
|align="right"|

See also
 List of Canadian federal electoral districts
 Past Canadian electoral districts

References

Riding history from the Library of Parliament
2011 Results from Elections Canada
 Campaign expense data from Elections Canada

Notes

Ontario federal electoral districts
Politics of Hamilton, Ontario
2003 establishments in Ontario